José Manuel Mateo Azcona (born 23 January 1975) is a Spanish retired footballer who played as a central defender, and a current manager.

Playing career
Born in Pamplona, Navarre, Mateo finished his formation at CA Osasuna, and made his senior debuts with the reserves in 1994. He was promoted to the main squad in 1996, and played his first match as a professional on 31 August, featuring the full 90 minutes in a 0–0 Segunda División away draw against UE Lleida.

Mateo scored his first professional goal on 8 March 1997, netting the first in a 1–1 home draw against CD Ourense. He was an ever-present figure in the 1999–2000 season, appearing in 40 matches and scoring a career-best three goals as his team returned to La Liga after a six-year absence.

On 10 September 2000, Mateo made his debut in the Spanish top flight, starting in a 0–2 home loss to RC Celta de Vigo. He scored his first goal in the competition on 29 October, netting the first in a 1–2 defeat with Valencia CF also at the El Sadar Stadium.

On 3 July 2004, after eight years in the Rojillos' first team, Mateo moved to second level club Real Valladolid. He remained in the same division in the following years, representing Recreativo de Huelva and Deportivo Alavés and retiring with the latter in 2009 at the age of 34.

Coaching career
After his retirement, Mateo was appointed manager of Osasuna's youth sides in 2010, and was dismissed after three years in charge. On 2 July 2013 he was named Deportivo Alavés B coach, but was sacked on 24 February of the following year.

In July 2014, Mateo returned to Osasuna and its reserves, now competing in Tercera División. On 28 February of the following year he was named manager of the first team, replacing the fired Jan Urban; he was himself relieved of his duties on 4 May, after six losses in only ten games.

Mateo returned to Osasuna's B-side on 21 July 2015, being appointed manager. On 7 June 2018, nearly one year after leaving them, he was named Burgos CF coach. After losing five of his first nine matches, he was dismissed by the third-tier club on 21 October.

Managerial statistics

References

External links

1975 births
Living people
Footballers from Pamplona
Spanish footballers
Association football defenders
La Liga players
Segunda División players
Segunda División B players
CA Osasuna B players
CA Osasuna players
Real Valladolid players
Recreativo de Huelva players
Deportivo Alavés players
Spanish football managers
Segunda División managers
Segunda División B managers
CA Osasuna managers
Burgos CF managers